Discrimination against people with red hair is the prejudice, stereotyping and dehumanization of people with naturally red hair, which can be the result of a genetic mutation. In contemporary form, it often involves a cultural discrimination against people with red hair. A number of stereotypes exist about people with red hair, many of which engender harmful or discriminatory treatment towards them. 

While discrimination against people with red hair has occurred for thousands of years and in many countries, in modern times it has been described as particularly acute in the United Kingdom, where there have been calls to designate red hair a protected characteristic covered by hate crime legislation.

Background
Naturally occurring red hair appears in a small minority of humans and is the rarest natural hair color, occurring in 0.6 percent of people. A smaller percentage of humans, approximately 0.17 percent or 13 million, have a combination of red hair and blue eyes.

Red hair is one potential manifestation of a gene mutation in the melanocortin 1 receptor (MC1R). While red hair most frequently occurs among European peoples, it is also present among persons of Asian descent or Africans with European admixture (though extremely rare). A higher prevalence of the MC1R mutation in Europe may be due to it promoting adaptability to low light environments as it facilitates efficient biosynthesis of Vitamin D among other survival traits such as higher resilience to certain types of pain, and increased levels of adrenaline that accelerates the fight-or-flight response.

The history of prejudice and discrimination against people with red hair dates back thousands of years. According to The Week, persons with red hair have to deal with "insults ... taunts, and ... hate crimes". Discrimination against people with red hair may be a factor of its relative rareness, as well as cultural attitudes and collective mythology. Judas Iscariot may have had red hair, and some Indo European folklore presents that people with red hair are vampires or transform into vampires after death. The assignment of prejudicial characteristics towards people with red hair, such as a propensity towards violence, may also be a long-lasting association Eurasian peoples had to the hair color resulting from their contact with aggressive and violent Thracian tribes which had a high prevalence of red hair.

Trends and occurrences

Ancient Egypt

In Ancient Egypt, men with red hair may have been used as human sacrifices to the god Osiris due to the belief that his archenemy, Set, had red hair and that those with red hair were, therefore, devotees of Set. Though, rulers of the Nineteenth Dynasty of Egypt may have been red haired followers of Set; Ramesses II had red hair and his father's name, Seti I, means "follower of Set".

Australia
In 2008, the Adelaide Zoo faced criticism after it launched a promotional campaign for its orangutan exhibit in which people with red hair were offered free admission. In promotional communication, the zoo compared people with red hair to the ape species, claimed people with red hair were destined for extinction, and used the pejorative term "ranga" to refer to them. In response to what the zoo characterized as a "negative reaction" to the campaign, it dropped one element that involved photographing people with red hair next to the orangutan exhibit for use in advertising materials. 

In 2010, several ads in Australia centered around ridiculing people with red hair. One, a government road safety campaign, suggested that using a mobile phone while driving might cause unwanted side effects such as sexual intercourse between two people with red hair, an occurrence which might result in the offspring also having red hair. Another, for ANZ Bank, featured a character of a bank clerk who was comically rude towards customers.

Canada
In 2009, students with red hair from at least three Canadian schools, were reportedly assaulted by their classmates, with one incident being confirmed by a court verdict. The students were influenced by a Facebook group that promoted so-called "Kick a Ginger Day", and possibly by a 2005 South Park episode.

France
Until recently, it was not uncommon for people with red hair in France to be called Poil de Judas ("hair of Judas"), a reference to the idea that Judas Iscariot had red hair.

Germany

In the past, red hair has been wrongly believed to be a characteristic associated exclusively or significantly with Jews, due to the belief that Judas Iscariot had red hair. In medieval Germany, some believed a tribe of Rote Juden, or "Red Jews", inhabited the Caucasus Mountains. According to myth, this was a reclusive tribe of Jews with red hair conspiring with the Antichrist to destroy Christianity. It has been hypothesized that this belief may have originated in the fragment of a social memory of the Khazars who, according to some sources, had a high prevalence of red hair and blue eyes.

In some instances, women with red hair were often presumed to be witches and subject to punitive violence.

United Kingdom
According to some observers, red haired people in the United Kingdom face particularly "aggressive" discrimination due to systemic "prejudice ... related to centuries-old matters of imperialism, religious bigotry and war". According to TRT World, the UK is "arguably the nation most hostile to this hair colour" despite red hair having the highest incidence in that country. The UK's Anti-Bullying Alliance has called for red hair to be listed as a protected characteristic, which would result in the targeting of people with red hair for criminal acts classified as a hate crime. Some have said that people with red hair are abused by those who would prefer to abuse racial minorities but feel restrained by hate crimes legislation and, therefore, target classes of people not protected by law.

In a 2013 article in New Statesman, columnist Nelson Jones chronicled several anecdotes of people with red hair who had been physically assaulted that year in the United Kingdom due to their hair color, including at least one stabbing. A 2014 study found that more than 90 percent of men in the UK with red hair had been the target of bullying due exclusively to their hair color. In addition, the study found, approximately 61 percent of males and 47 percent of females with red hair reported encountering "some kind of discrimination in the past" as a result of their hair color.

According to Lily Cole, who has red hair, being bullied as a child for red hair in the UK was "not dissimilar" to experiencing racial abuse. Prince Harry and David Kitson have reported being abused as a result of their hair color. The head of one children's charity reported that levels of abuse in the UK were significant and said there was "nothing like this in the U.S."

In 2015, a person with red hair was convicted of terrorist offenses over a plot to assassinate Prince Charles and Prince William in order to ensure Prince Harry, who has red hair, would become King of the United Kingdom. The man attributed his genetic supremacist views towards childhood bullying to which he'd been subjected over his hair color. 

In 2018, a television advertisement for Carlton & United Breweries Yak Ales was criticized after the Advertising Standards Authority found that it vilified people with red hair by suggesting society should work towards their eradication. Carlton & United ultimately pulled the ad, but declined to apologize for it.

In 2022, Sheffield-based human rights advocate Chrissy Meleady called for more protection for red-haired children, noting some bullying incidents, including a teaching assistant being fired for making fun of a red-haired student.

United States
The television program South Park has dealt with the topic of discrimination against people with red hair, most notably in the 2005 episode "Ginger Kids". According to anecdotal reports, children with red hair are regularly assaulted on the so-called "Kick a Ginger Day" supposedly inspired by the episode. In 2015, police in Massachusetts investigated a conspiracy among students to attack other students with red hair on the date.

Cryos International, one of the world's largest sperm banks, said in 2011 that they had too many sperm doses from red-haired individuals, but agency director Ole Schou said that they "have nothing against red-haired donors".

In some cases, discrimination can occur in the form of preferencing people with red hair over those without red hair. A 2014 study found that 30 per cent of television commercials during primetime viewing hours in the United States prominently featured someone with red hair with, at one point, CBS showing a person with red hair once every 106 seconds, numbers not accurately reflective of the actual population of persons with the hair color. Andrew Rohm, professor of marketing at Loyola Marymount University, attributed the prevalence of red hair in television advertising as an attempt by companies to capture viewer attention by showing people with what they perceived to be unusual or exotic physical characteristics.

The casting of Halle Bailey, who does not have red hair, to perform the role of Ariel in The Little Mermaid, a remake of the 1989 film where the protagonist does, was criticized by some people as the character was "a wonderful role model for young ginger girls, and this casting is a loss for them", however this has been perceived as code for displeasure that Bailey is not white.

Stereotypes
Stereotypes can contribute to hostility towards a group, engender toxic prejudices, and are often used to justify discrimination and oppression. The propagation of stereotypes results, according to linguist Karen Stollznow, in those with red hair frequently having "low self-esteem ... [experiencing] insecurity, and ... [feeling] a profound sense of being not only different from other people but also inferior".

Personality stereotypes
Stereotypes about people with red hair include the ideas that they are in league with Satanic forces, or of Irish ancestry, both of which are not supported by evidence. 

In some areas, people with red hair may be stereotyped as more "competent" than persons with other hair colors, which may manifest in the form of a reverse discriminatory selection bias in which persons with red hair are placed into leadership positions over other humans at atypically high rates. A study in the UK found that the number of CEOs of top companies with red hair was four times higher than the percentage of persons with red hair in the general population.

Deviance, temper, and violence
Other stereotypes include that red-haired persons have a propensity to violence or are short-tempered, which are not directly supported by scientific evidence, though some research suggests they produce higher levels of adrenaline which accelerates the fight-or-flight response. 

A 1901 eugenicist study in the United States concluded that "red hair is infrequent among born criminals but abundant among the insane and sexual offenders". One contemporary study has shown that persons with red hair are significantly less likely to experience mental illness.

A 1946 study by Hans von Hentig published in the Journal of Criminal Law and Criminology observed that there was a high prevalence of red hair among high-profile criminals in the Old West and that "the number of redheaded men among the noted outlaws surpassed their rate in the normal population". Von Hentig, however, attributed this not to a numerically higher incidence of crime among red haired persons but because "of their striking appearance, they might have been remembered rather than ordinary men who killed and were killed." It's also reported that many red-haired persons are perceived as "soulless" and had the ability to steal your soul if you looked in their eyes long enough.

Physical stereotypes
Studies have shown that people with red hair experience pain differently than others. According to the National Institutes of Health, "... studies suggest that their general pain tolerance may be higher. People with red hair also respond more effectively to opioid pain medications, requiring lower doses." Persons with red hair may also experience changes in temperature faster and with greater intensity than others and biosynthesize Vitamin D more efficiently than those without red hair. For unclear reasons related to the MC1R mutation, men with red hair are significantly less likely to develop prostate cancer than others. 

Because the MC1R mutation does not bind to the PTEN gene, persons with red hair are more at risk of melanoma and benefit from limited sun exposure. For unknown reasons, they are also significantly more likely to develop Parkinson's disease than persons without red hair. Women with red hair have a higher prevalence of endometriosis. It has been theorized that these problems are due to the fact that genetic factors causing red hair emerged at a later date than those for other hair colors and have not yet had an opportunity to benefit from corrective evolution.

Sexual stereotypes
Men have been stereotyped as being well endowed, and both men and women with red hair have been stereotyped as sexually promiscuous or having unusually active libidos. Some research suggests men and women with red hair engage in sexual intercourse with greater frequency than others due to a combination of the psychology of color that preferences red, and their ability to attract attention through hair color uniqueness. Other research indicates persons with red hair first have sexual intercourse at a later age than those who do not have red hair, but subsequently have more sexual partners than other humans.

Terminology

Slurs and derogatory terms
The term "ginger" is considered by some to be pejorative or offensive, with some considering it only acceptable when used by a person with red hair to refer to themselves or others with red hair. The use of the term to refer to persons with red hair may be a reference to the spicy ginger root, an amplification of the stereotype that persons with red hair have abrupt tempers or are prone to violence.

The phrase "redheaded stepchild" is a term used, mainly in the United States, to describe a "person or thing that is neglected, unwanted, or mistreated". Using "Red" as a nickname to refer to a person with red hair has been described as overly familiar and potentially offensive. The "white-skinned other" is considered a prejudicial term to refer to Caucasians with red hair.

"Ranga" is a slang term used in Australia to refer to a person with red hair and is an abbreviation of "orangutan", a subhuman primate. It is considered an insult. Andrew Rochford has called for Australians to stop using it.

Non-derogatory terms
According to the Associated Press Stylebook, "red-haired, redhead and redheaded are all acceptable for a person with red hair." Some people with red hair prefer the term auburn to describe their hair color. American author Mark Twain, who had red hair, said that auburn is typically a color descriptor used for persons with red hair of higher social class.

See also
 List of redheads
 Blonde stereotype § Dumb blonde
 Discrimination based on hair texture

References

Discrimination in the United Kingdom
Discrimination in the United States
Red hair